Agriculture University, Kota (AUK) is an agricultural university situated in Kota, Rajasthan, India. It was established in 2013  by the Government of Rajasthan under Agriculture University, Kota Act, 2013, by bifurcating Maharana Pratap University of Agriculture and Technology and Swami Keshwanand Rajasthan Agricultural University. 
Its jurisdiction covers six districts, namely Kota, Baran, Bundi, Jhalawar, Karauli  and Sawai Madhopur. Dinesh Chandra Joshi was appointed vice chancellor in 2019.

Colleges
The university includes two colleges, College of Horticulture and Forestry, Jhalawar and College of Agriculture, Ummedganj, Kota.

References

External links

Universities in Rajasthan
Educational institutions established in 2013
2013 establishments in Rajasthan
Universities and colleges in Kota, Rajasthan
Agricultural universities and colleges in Rajasthan